Heinrich Jansen (1625 – 1667), was a Danish Baroque painter.

Biography
He was born in Flensburg and trained under Rembrandt during the years 1645–1648. He worked in Copenhagen 1657-1661 as court painter to Frederick III of Denmark and in 1662 returned to live in Flensburg.

References

1625 births
1667 deaths
Danish Baroque painters
Danish male painters
People from Flensburg
Court painters
Pupils of Rembrandt